Women's Olympic Football tournament was held for the third time at the 2004 Summer Olympics. The tournament featured 10 women's national teams from six continental confederations. The 10 teams were drawn into two groups of three and one group of four and each group played a round-robin tournament. At the end of the group stage, the top teams from each group advanced to the knockout stage, beginning with the quarter-finals and culminating with the gold medal match at Karaiskakis Stadium on 26 August 2004.

Qualification

Several qualification tournaments were held to determine the participating nations.

Venues

The tournament was held in five venues across five cities:
Karaiskakis Stadium, Athens
Pankritio Stadium, Heraklion
Pampeloponnisiako Stadium, Patras
Kaftanzoglio Stadium, Thessaloniki
Panthessaliko Stadium, Volos

Seeding
Originally, the tournament was planned to form two groups of five teams in the group stage, then play a knockout stage by four teams (two top teams in each group).
The format is later changed: the tournament is to form three groups of three or four teams in the group stage, then play a knockout stage by eight teams (two top teams in each group and two best third-placed teams from three groups).

Squads

Match officials

Group stage
Competing countries were divided into three groups: two containing three teams (groups E and F) and one containing four teams (group G). Teams in each group played one another in a round-robin. The top two teams of each group advanced to the knockout stage, along with the third-placed team from the four-team group (group G) and the better-ranked third-placed team from the three-team groups (groups E and F).

Key:
Teams highlighted in green went through to the knockout stages.

Group E

Group F

Group G

Ranking of third-placed teams from groups of three

Knockout stage

Quarter-finals

Semi-finals

Bronze medal match

Gold medal match

Statistics

Goalscorers

Assists

FIFA Fair Play Award
Japan and Sweden won the FIFA Fair Play Award, given to the team with the best record of fair play during the tournament. Every match in the tournament was taken into account, though only teams that played at least three matches were eligible to win the award.

Tournament ranking

Notes

References

External links
Olympic Football Tournaments Athens 2004 – Women, FIFA.com
RSSSF Summary
FIFA Technical Report

Oly
 
2004
Women's events at the 2004 Summer Olympics